Valentine Page (1891–1978) was a British motorcycle designer, who worked for several of the UK's leading marques, including Ariel, Triumph, and BSA. Page was an innovator whose radical designs include the Triumph 6/1,  BSA Gold Star, BSA A7 and BSA M20, the J.A.Prestwich engine of the Brough Superior SS100, and the Ariel Leader.

J.A Prestwich

Val Page served his apprenticeship as a motorcycle engineer and designer with J.A. Prestwich. Page designed the engines used in the Brough Superior SS100 and SS80 luxury motorcycles, and developed the racing motorcycles which made riders such as Bert le Vack famous.

Ariel Motorcycles

Page spent most of his career with Ariel Motorcycles, which he joined in 1925. Eventually, he became chief designer and developed a new range of motorcycles for the 1926 season. Starting with an advanced engine, Page had to wait until 1927 before a suitable frame and cycle parts were designed. These formed the basis for what was to be the Ariel Red Hunter, which continued successfully until Ariel ceased production of four strokes in 1959.

Triumph
Page left Ariel in 1932 to become chief designer at the rival Triumph Motorcycles where, with Edward Turner, he developed Triumph's first parallel twin, the model 6/1, and a range of singles, including a 150cc two-stroke and 250, 350 and 500cc four-strokes.

BSA
Moving to BSA in 1936, Page designed all new models (except the V-twins) including the Empire Star, which was developed into the high performance production BSA Gold Star, named in celebration of Wal Handley's 100 mph lap time at the Brooklands circuit. The innovative Gold Star had a single cylinder 500 cc engine with twin pushrods operating double-coil springs and overhead valves. The pushrod tunnel was an integral casting in the cylinder block. Page also designed the dependable BSA M20 motorcycle, of which 125,000 saw wartime use.

Return to Ariel
After the war he returned to Ariel where he designed the monocoque Ariel Leader in 1958.

References

1891 births
1978 deaths
British motorcycle pioneers
British motorcycle designers